South Eastern Railway may refer to:

 South Eastern Railway zone, a subdivision of the railways of India
 South Eastern Railway (England), a former (1836 to 1922) railway company in the UK
 Southeastern Railway (Russia), a railway company in Russia
 Southeastern Railway (Florida), a former (1899 to 1902) railway company in the US
 South Eastern Railway (Quebec), a railway in Canada

See also
 South Eastern & Chatham Railway
 Southeastern (train operating company)